Matt Keating is a singer/songwriter from Boston, Massachusetts, United States. His music has been described in terms of various genres, including Americana, power-pop, rock, and folk rock.

Biography
Keating grew up in the Boston area and first began performing as a pianist in local clubs. He played in several local bands, including Circle Sky, before moving to New York City, where he eventually signed with Alias Records.

After several releases on Alias, he took an extended break from recording, returning in 2003 with the Tilt a Whirl album.

Discography
Satan Sings EP (Alias Records, 1993)
Tell it to Yourself (Alias Records, 1993)
Scaryarea (Alias Records, 1995)
Candy Valentine EP (Alias Records, 1996)
Killjoy (Alias Records, 1997)
Tilt a Whirl (Poptones, 2003)
Summer Night (Kealon Records, 2006)
Quixotic (MRI Records, 2008)
Between The Customers (Kealon Records, 2010)
 Wrong Way Home ( Sojourn Records, 2012)
This Perfect Crime (Janglewood Records, 2015)

References

External links
Matt Keating Official Website

American indie rock musicians
American male singers
Singers from Massachusetts
Living people
Year of birth missing (living people)